Ruby Friedman is an American singer/songwriter/composer, with roots in New Orleans, New York, and Los Angeles.  She is the leader of the Ruby Friedman Orchestra.

Career
The Ruby Friedman Orchestra has been in studio in New Orleans, in New York City with Josh Valleau at The Glass Wall, with Peter Malick at OCL Studios  in Calgary, and at his studio in Los Angeles.  Final recording, production and mixing were done by Alex Elena and Topher Mohr at Beethoven Studios in Culver City. The band released their debut album, Gem on November 11, 2016.  The first single from the album, "I'm Not Your Friend", was released in June 2016

In late 2019, Ruby Friedman recorded with Mitchell Froom for her upcoming release entitled Late Afternoon Highs. The single entitled "Teardrop Trailer" has been released and first premiered on KCSN by DJ Nic Harcourt on radio and buzzbands.la in online media. 
 
The version of "You'll Never Leave Harlan Alive", was featured in the Season Five finale of Justified. Graham Yost, creator and Executive Producer of the series, discussed the use of the Ruby Friedman version in the show.

Her version of the song was also selected for use in the Emmy-winning Reveal documentary, The Dead Unknown, an investigative report on a 1969 cold case regarding the disappearance and murder of a young woman, in Harlan, Kentucky, in June 1969.

In late 2015, The Golden Globe Award and Emmy Award winning Amazon Studios TV show Transparent selected the arrangement featuring her vocals on the Gina Villalobos/Eric Colvin produced version of the Sly and the Family Stone hit Family Affair for use in the trailer promoting the launch of Season 2.

In 2015, Ruby Friedman performed the vocals on the song, "Hunt You Down" for the CLIO award-winning advertising campaign for the  launch of the Sony PS4 game, Bloodborne. The song is a collaboration with The Hit House Music, and was written by Scott Miller and William Hunt.  It was recorded by Wyn Davis  in Los Angeles, and by Ruby Friedman at Word of Mouth Recording Studios in New Orleans.  The Petrol Advertising campaign using the song won the Golden Trailer Award for best Video Game TV Spot. The song was released as a single in conjunction with availability of the game.

In March 2015, the EP, Song of the Demimonde was released, containing seven tracks of her most-requested cover material. "House of the Rising Sun",  the last song on the EP,> was recorded at Word of Mouth Recording Studios in New Orleans with  New Orleans piano player Tom McDermott, and Smashing Pumpkins violinist, Ysanne Spevack.

She has also performed with McDermott, and Ysanne Spevack, in New Orleans, Emmy Award and Grammy Award-nominated TV series Treme),  In both April 2015 and 2016, she performed at Buffa's and at the Lagnaippe Stage for Jazzfest with McDermott and others.

She has been retained by the estate of 20th Century Academy Award film song composer Harry Warren to re-imagine and record some of the extensive Harry Warren catalog. The catalog consists of hundreds of songs, from Academy Award winners to unfinished works in process. Several of these recordings, "Rose Tattoo", "Ungrateful Heart", and "Welcome to the Party" are included on the Song of the Demimonde EP.

In 2014, Ruby Friedman was commissioned to perform two songs, including the title track, on a tribute album, Life, honoring the life and music of Tarka Cordell, (produced by Alex Elena). Other contributing vocalists on the album include Lily Allen, Imani Coppola, and Evan Dando.

Her original songs have been selected for promotional use on NBC and have been licensed internationally for continued use in the Got Talent franchise.  Her songs or vocals  have also been licensed for use by Fox Sports and numerous movie and video game trailers, recently in 2017 trailers for the film Marshall and Netflix miniseries Godless. The original song, Drowned, was also featured in Season Three of the television show Sons of Anarchy. She composed extensive original score for the 2018 World Cup special Phenoms on Fox Sports. She was commissioned to compose and perform the official theme song for author Kim Michele Richardson's New York Times bestseller The Book Woman of Troublesome Creek to be used in various advertising platforms and future media. She has recently been co-writing compositions for the upcoming Wynonna Judd album. Her original music is regularly supported by KCRW as well many other independent radio stations.

Ruby Friedman Orchestra has toured with Brian Wilson and Jeff Bridges  She has also provided live backup vocals for many legends as well including Donovan and Heart.  When in Los Angeles, she has headlined at the House of Blues, The Troubadour, The Viper Room, Hotel Café, Los Globos, Echoplex, and Pershing Square.  She has made numerous invited guest appearances, including performances with Bernard Fowler, with Grammy Award nominee Scott Healy, with the Jeff Goldblum jazz ensemble, and at many events at the Sayers Club. She performed an acoustic invitation only show, at the Turn Gallery in Soho, accompanied by Imani Coppola, Matthew Steer, Maiya Sykes, Ben Crippin Taylor, and Conor Brendan.

Discography

References

External links
 Ruby Friedman Official Site
Paperback Trade Fiction Books - Best Sellers - Books - The New York Times

Year of birth missing (living people)
Living people
American women singers
American women songwriters
American women composers
American multi-instrumentalists
Songwriters from California
University of California, Los Angeles alumni
21st-century American women